Bane Hunter (born 28 August 1966) is a former media executive and Australian businessman who was awarded Australia’s largest ever penalty for misleading corporate conduct for his company GetSwift.

As former executive chairman of “market darling” GetSwift, which he co-founded with Joel Macdonald, Hunter was found guilty on 29 counts of misleading conduct in 2023, fined A$2M and banned from managing companies for 15 years - the largest penalty handed down by the Australian Federal Court - and resulted in reforms to listing rules on the Australian Securities Exchange (ASX).

Hunter was accused by the Federal Court of driving “a public relations-driven approach to corporate disclosure” which lead to the company raising $104 million from investors.  In 2018 Hunter and his company were subject to a $300M class action lawsuit and was successfully sued by the corporate regulator ASIC.

In awarding Hunter the largest ever penalty, Justice Lee stated Hunter “is a man who is presently wholly unsuited to be in a position of responsibility in a public company” and that he “was not only a bully, but also someone who had a laser-like focus on making money for himself and Mr Macdonald. If that involved breaking the law regulating financial markets, or exposing GetSwift to third party liability, that was of little concern to him”.

Hunter currently sits on the advisory board of Australian listed company Tiny Beans.

Getswift 
In May 2015 Hunter joined Australian Software-as-a-Service logistics startup GetSwift as executive chairman.  In 2016 the company listed on the Australian Securities Exchange (ASX) later raising $75M and saw its shares surge 800% on news that it had secured contracts with Amazon, the Commonwealth Bank of Australia and Yum Brands. However, the shares subsequently collapsed following a temporary trade suspension after it was revealed these customers were simply trialling the GetSwift software.  

In April 2018 Hunter replaced co-founder Mr Macdonald as CEO of GetSwift.

Class action for breach of continuous disclosure 
In February 2018 Hunter and GetSwift faced a $300M class action lawsuit (subsequently revised to $75-100M) for the alleged breach of continuous disclosure.  The lawsuit claimed Mr Hunter "ought to have reasonably known that [GetSwift] had no reasonable grounds to consider that it would derive quantifiable and measurable benefits from contracts with customers when they were still subject to a trial or pilot period".

The company reached a settlement agreement in July 2021.

Civil case of misleading and deceptive behaviour 
In February 2019 the Australian Securities and Investment Commission (ASIC) commenced civil proceedings against Hunter and alleged that Hunter made several misleading statements to the public and that they failed to discharge their duties to the public.

Four years later, in February 2023, The Federal Court of Australia found Hunter guilty on 29 counts of misleading conduct, fined him A$2M and banned from managing companies for 15 years - the largest penalty ever handed down by the Court.

ASX reforms listing rules to include evidence of "good fame and character" 
In response to the civil proceedings bought against Hunter, the Australian Securities Exchange (ASX) reformed its listing rules, now requiring all listed and prospective Company directors to provide evidence of their "good fame and character". The changes would either result in a disclosure of the results of the checks or in some cases the rejection of the listing.

Bankruptcy 
In February 2022 Hunter resigned as CEO and in August 2022 GetSwift filed for bankruptcy in the US.

Early Business Career 
Hunter started his career in media at MTV Networks in 2005 in New York where he quickly rose to become Chief Product Officer by 2010.

In 2010 Hunter moved to Conde Nast as a Senior Executive Director where he stayed for 2 years.

Hunter then became Chief Product Officer at A&E Television networks in New York and Los Angeles.

In 2013 Hunter entered the Australian startup scene where he joined (and later became) CEO of The Loop - a visual networking platform that was used by 67% of Australian professionals - after displacing The Loop's co-founder Pip Jamieson.

In May 2015 Hunter joined Australian startup GetSwift as an executive director and later became CEO in 2018 after co-founder and former CEO Joel Macdonald stepped down as the company faced  legal challenges.

References 

1966 births
Living people
21st-century Australian businesspeople
Australian businesspeople